M-20 is a state trunkline highway in the US state of Michigan that runs from New Era to Midland. It crosses through rural Lower Peninsula forest land between the two ends. The highway serves the college towns of Big Rapids and Mt. Pleasant, home of the main campuses of Ferris State University and Central Michigan University, both located near the trunkline.

The original July 1919 routing took M-20 farther north along a corridor now used by US Highway 10 (US 10). The M-20 designation was shifted south to the current corridor in 1926. The eastern end was truncated from Bay City to Midland in 1960, following the opening of a freeway between the two cities. The western end was rerouted from Muskegon to New Era in 1969.

Route description
M-20 starts near Lake Michigan at the US 31 freeway in New Era where it runs east through the Manistee National Forest, crossing the North Branch of the White River near Ferry and the South Branch near Hesperia on the way to White Cloud.  There it turns south along M-37 and then east along a new routing following Baseline and Newcosta roads north of the Hardy Dam to meet the US 131 freeway at exit 131 near Stanwood. M-20 turns north, running concurrently along the US 131 freeway to Big Rapids and joins Business US 131 (Bus. US 131) at exit 139. The section along the freeway is listed on the National Highway System (NHS), a system of highways important to the nation's economy, defense and mobility. Together Bus. US 131/M-20 runs along the Perry Street commercial corridor to State Street near the main campus of Ferris State University. The business loop turns north by the campus and at Maple Street, M-20 turns eastward to cross the Muskegon River in downtown Big Rapids, north of the campus. M-20 zig-zags southeast of town bypassing the Canadian Lakes area and turns due east through rural Remus in Mecosta County and the Isabella Indian Reservation in neighboring Isabella County.

In Mt. Pleasant, M-20 runs near the campus of Central Michigan University crossing the Chippewa River, and the trunkline joins Bus. US 127 along the Mission Street business area to Pickard Road. The highway turns east on Pickard and passes under the US 127 freeway near the Soaring Eagle Casino. From Mt. Pleasant to Midland, M-20 is designed as a four–lane highway with a continuous center turn lane passing through rural forest land. M-20 picks up inclusion on the NHS from this point east.

Once M-20 reaches Midland on Jerome Street, it crosses the Tittabawassee River north of the Tridge, a three-legged bridge over the confluence of the Tittabawassee and Chippewa rivers. There it joins Business US 10 (Bus. US 10) on a pair of one-way streets: Indian Street (westbound) and Buttles Street (eastbound). The two streets pass by Dow Diamond, home to the Great Lakes Loons, the city's minor league baseball team. Bus. US 10/M-20 then passes some Dow Chemical Company buildings and curves into a freeway stub connecting with the US 10 freeway on the east side of town. This short section of business loop freeway has two interchanges before terminating at one final interchange.  At this junction, both Bus. US 10 and M-20 have a common eastern terminus.  Traffic headed eastbound on the business loop defaults onto eastbound US 10, and traffic destined for the business loop is fed from the westbound direction of the freeway only.

History

Previous designation
On July 1, 1919, M-20 was routed from Ludington to Bay City, Michigan by way of Reed City and Clare. This routing was redesignated as US 10 on November 11, 1926. M-20 would be moved to a new routing.

Current designation
The M-20 designation was moved to a new alignment, roughly today's current routing from Midland through Mt. Pleasant, Big Rapids and White Cloud continuing to Muskegon. The western terminus was extended to end at Muskegon State Park in 1932. The last paving would be completed along M-20 in 1957 in Newaygo County.

The eastern end of M-20 was converted to freeway between Midland and Bay City in 1958. The former alignment along Midland Road, from Midland, going through Auburn, and ending at Euclid Avenue in Bay City, at the junction of what was then US 23, was returned to local control at the time. US 10 was rerouted along this freeway section and the Interstate 75/US 23 freeway in 1960. M-20 was truncated back to Midland with the US 10 rerouting. The west end was rerouted through Muskegon to end at US 16 in 1961. The former routing connecting to Muskegon State Park became a new state route designated M-213. M-213 was ultimately removed from the trunkline system in 1970. M-20 was completely rerouted on the west end in 1969 from White Cloud replacing M-82 to US 31 in New Era.

The Michigan Department of Transportation (MDOT) swapped jurisdiction of M-20 and B-88 with Mecosta and Newaygo counties. The swap was finalized on October 1, 1998. M-20 was rerouted south from Big Rapids, along US 131 from exit 139 to exit 131 at Stanwood. There M-20 replaced B-88 westward to M-37.

Major intersections

See also

References

External links

M-20 at Michigan Highways

020
U.S. Route 10
Transportation in Oceana County, Michigan
Transportation in Newaygo County, Michigan
Transportation in Mecosta County, Michigan
Transportation in Isabella County, Michigan
Transportation in Midland County, Michigan
Transportation in Bay County, Michigan